Nekhbet (also spelt Nekhebit) is an early predynastic local goddess in Egyptian mythology, who was the patron of the city of Nekheb (her name meaning of Nekheb). Ultimately, she became the patron of Upper Egypt and one of the two patron deities (alongside Wadjet) for all of Ancient Egypt when it was unified.

Mythology

 
One of Egypt's earliest temples was the shrine of Nekhbet at Nekheb (also referred to as El Kab). It was the companion city to Nekhen, the religious and political capital of Upper Egypt, at the end of the Predynastic period (c. 3200–3100 BC) and probably, also during the Early Dynastic Period (c. 3100–2686 BC). The original settlement on the Nekhen site dates from Naqada I or the late Badarian cultures. At its height, from about 3400 BC, Nekhen had at least 5,000 and possibly as many as 10,000 inhabitants. 

Nekhbet was the tutelary deity of Upper Egypt. Nekhbet and her Lower Egyptian counterpart Wadjet often appeared together as the "Two Ladies". One of the titles of each ruler was the Nebty name, which began with the hieroglyphs for [s/he] of the Two Ladies....

Iconography 

In art, Nekhbet was depicted as a vulture. Alan Gardiner identified the species that was used in divine iconography as a griffon vulture. Arielle P. Kozloff, however, argues that the vultures in New Kingdom art, with their blue-tipped beaks and loose skin, better resemble the lappet-faced vulture.

In New Kingdom times, the vulture appeared alongside the uraeus on the headdresses with which kings were buried. The uraeus and vulture are traditionally interpreted as Wadjet and Nekhbet, but Edna R. Russmann has suggested that in this context they represent Isis and Nephthys, two major funerary goddesses, instead.

Nekhbet usually was depicted hovering, with her wings spread above the royal image, clutching a shen symbol (representing eternal encircling protection), frequently in her claws.

Gallery

In popular culture

Nekhbet is a bird-like monster in Final Fantasy XII.

Nekhbet appears in Rick Riordan's The Throne of Fire as a minor antagonist.

Nekhbet is the name of a pet vulture in the anime Tenshi ni Narumon.

References

Further reading 
 Hans Bonnet: Nechbet. In: Lexikon der ägyptischen Religionsgeschichte. Nikol, Hamburg 2000, S. 507f.
 Wolfgang Helck, Eberhard Otto: Nechbet. In: Kleines Lexikon der Ägyptologie. Harrassowitz, Wiesbaden 1999, S. 199.
 Alexandra von Lieven: Grundriss des Laufes der Sterne – Das sogenannte Nutbuch. The Carsten Niebuhr Institute of Ancient Eastern Studies (u. a.), Kopenhagen 2007, .
 Alexandra von Lieven: Der Himmel über Esna – Eine Fallstudie zur religiösen Astronomie in Ägypten am Beispiel der kosmologischen Decken- und Architravinschriften im Tempel von Esna. Harrassowitz, Wiesbaden 2000, .
 Marcelle Werbrouck, Fouilles de El Kab II. 1940, S. 46ff.

Egyptian goddesses
Tutelary deities
Upper Egypt

ca:Llista de personatges de la mitologia egípcia#N